, also abbreviated as DDDDD, is a Japanese manga series written and illustrated by Inio Asano. It is about two high school girls who struggle with the mundanity of life after an alien spaceship descends on Japan. The manga was serialized in Shogakukan's seinen manga magazine Big Comic Spirits from April 2014 to February 2022. It is licensed in North America by Viz Media.

An anime adaptation by Production +h. has been announced.

As of March 2022, Dead Dead Demon's Dededede Destruction had over 3 million copies in circulation. In 2021, the manga won the 66th Shogakukan Manga Award in the general category, as well as the Excellence Award of the 25th Japan Media Arts Festival in 2022.

Plot
A large spaceship appears over Tokyo three years before the story starts. A one-sided war against the seemingly harmless aliens ensues, sparking controversy and pacifism.

Despite this unique and tragic event, high school girls Koyama Kadode and Nakagawa Ouran behave as if nothing has changed. They live their days like they always have. The focus of this story is not the alien invasion, but human nature, dialogue, growing up, and life.

Characters
 
A girl in her third year of high school. She loves the iconic manga character Isobeyan.
 
Ouran is a very flamboyant girl, who often rambles on about her goal to enslave or lead the human race to destruction. However, despite her seemingly flamboyant and sociable personality, Ouran tends to only show her true self to her friends and family. She is Kadode's best friend.

Media

Manga
Dead Dead Demon's Dededede Destruction, written and illustrated by Inio Asano, was first announced with the tentative title . The manga started in Shogakukan's  manga magazine Big Comic Spirits on April 28, 2014. The series went on hiatus multiple times. It finished on February 28, 2022. Shogakukan collected its chapters in twelve  volumes, released from September 30, 2014, to March 30, 2022.

Viz Media announced at Comic-Con International 2017 that it had licensed the manga in North America. The manga has also been licensed in Brazil by Editora JBC, in France by Kana, in Spain by Norma Editorial, in Germany by Tokyopop, and in Italy by Panini Comics.

Volume list

Anime 
In March 2022, it was announced that the series will receive an anime adaptation by Production +h.

Reception
As of March 2022, the manga had over 3 million copies in circulation.

Dead Dead Demon's Dededede Destruction placed 18th on Takarajimasha's Kono Manga ga Sugoi! 2016 ranking of top 20 manga for male readers. It has won the French award the "Daruma Best Drawing manga" at the Japan Expo Awards in 2017. The series was chosen as one of the Best Manga at the Comic-Con International Best & Worst Manga of 2018. The manga received the Attilio Micheluzzi Award in 2018 for the Best Foreign Manga. The series won the French Konishi Prize for the Best Translated Manga. In 2021, along with Police in a Pod, Dead Dead Demon's Dededede Destruction won the 66th Shogakukan Manga Award in the general category. It also won an Excellence Award in the Manga Division at the 25th Japan Media Arts Festival in 2022.

The manga was nominated for an Eisner Award in the category "Best U.S. Edition of International Material—Asia" in 2019.

References

External links
  
  
  
 

2014 manga
Anime series based on manga
Extraterrestrials in anime and manga
Inio Asano
Science fiction anime and manga
Seinen manga
Shogakukan manga
Slice of life anime and manga
Viz Media manga
Winners of the Shogakukan Manga Award for general manga